ITU School of Mines, located in Maslak campus, is one of the faculties in Istanbul Technical University, which has five departments. As of 2013, the dean is Prof. Dr. Fatma Arslan. Among the notable faculty of the ITU School of Mines are Galip Sağıroğlu, İhsan Ketin, Aykut Barka, Celal Şengör and Kazım Ergin.

The faculty's departments are:
 Mining engineering
 Geological engineering
 Petroleum and natural gas engineering  
 Geophysical engineering
 Mineral processing engineering

History 
The Faculty of Mines was established March 1, 1953 in Istanbul. In its first years, the faculty was composed of mainly Turkish and German professors, and its program was similar to those days' famous mining schools such as RWTH Aachen University, Clausthal University of Technology then in West Germany and Freiberg University of Mining and Technology in East Germany. The Faculty of Mines accepted its first students in 1953 with a faculty of eleven scientists.

References

External links 
 ITU School of Mines
 School of Mines anthem
 Past deans
 ITU Department of Mining engineering
 ITU Department of Geological engineering
 ITU Department of Petroleum and Natural Gas Engineering
 Geophysical Engineering
 Mineral Processing Engineering

Istanbul Technical University
Educational institutions established in 1953
Schools of mines
1953 establishments in Turkey